An election to Shetland Islands Council was held on 8 May 1986 as part of the regional elections. The election saw Labour gain another two seats on the Shetland Islands Council, and also saw the Shetland Movement contest the election on a party political platform for the first time.  The outgoing three-term Convener, A.I. Tulloch, died just one day before the election.

Aggregate results

Ward Results

By-elections since 1986

References

1986 Scottish local elections
1986